Sketch is a South Korean television series starring Rain, Lee Sun-bin, Lee Dong-gun, Jung Jin-young, Kang Shin-il, Lim Hwa-young and Lee Seung-joo. It aired on JTBC from May 25, 2018 to July 14, 2018.

Synopsis
The plot revolves around an ace detective, Kang Dong-soo (Jung Ji-hoon), and a female detective, Yoo Shi-hyun (Lee Sun-bin), who can sketch out the future as they try to capture a serial killer.

Cast

Main
 Rain as Kang Dong-soo
An ace detective armed with excellent intuition and executive ability. 
 Lee Dong-gun as Kim Do-jin
A member of a Republic of Korea Army Special Warfare Command who seeks revenge for the death of his wife.
 Lee Sun-bin as Yoo Shi-hyun 
A detective who has the psychic ability to sketch out drawings of what will happen three days in the future.                       
 Jung Jin-young as Jang Tae-joon
 A mysterious man. Chief of Internal Affairs.
 Kang Shin-il as Moon Jae-hyun
Team leader of the Butterfly Project.
 Lim Hwa-young as Oh Young-shim
A technical assistant of the Butterfly Project that provides crucial information to the team.
 Song Ji-woo as young Oh Young-shim
  as Yoo Si-joon
Prosecutor and elder brother of Yoo Shi-hyun.

Recurring
 Yoo Da-in as Min Ji-soo
Kang Dong-soo's fiancé
 Lee Joong-ok as Seo Sang-goo	
 Shim Wan-joon as Lee
  as Nam Sun-woo 
  as Doctor Oh 
 Kim Yong-hee as Jung Il-woo
  as An Kyung-tae
 Park Doo-shik as Jung Il-soo 
 Joo Min-kyung as Lee Soo-young 
  as Park Mi-moon
  as Baek Woo-jin 
  as Kim Sun-mi 
 Lee Ki-hyuk as Lee Jin-yeong's husband
 Kim Hee-jung as Shi-hyun's mother

Special appearance
 Yoon Bok-in as Oh Yeong-sim's mother

Production
Hwang Jung-eum was offered the lead role but declined.

This drama reunites Rain and Lee Dong-gun who have worked together 15 years ago in the drama Sang Doo! Let's Go to School.

The first script reading took place in March, 2018 at the JTBC building in Sangam, Seoul.

Original soundtrack

Part 1

Part 2

Part 3

Part 4

Part 5

Viewership

Awards and nominations

Notes

References

External links
   
 

 

2018 South Korean television series debuts
Korean-language television shows
South Korean action television series
JTBC television dramas
2018 South Korean television series endings
Television series by Drama House